Juno Falls are a folk pop band from Dublin, Ireland.

History

After forming in 2003, the group signed a publishing deal with Sony Music Publishing. A year later, they released their debut album Starlight Drive. The group then signed with V2 Records and released their sophomore album Weightless in 2007. Writing for AllMusic, Stewart Mason wrote "Unfortunately, just as Weightless was released in the U.K., Juno Falls' label, V2 Records, underwent a complete restructuring, meaning this fine, likable, and potentially commercially successful record largely disappeared upon its release."

Discography

Albums
 Starlight Drive (2004) SN8 CD/LP
 Weightless (2007) V2 Records CD/LP

External links
Official website

References

Irish folk musical groups
Musical groups from Dublin (city)
Irish pop music groups
Musical groups established in 2003